St Margaret's Church is a Grade II listed parish church in the Church of England in Hawes, North Yorkshire.

History

Also known as Church of Saint Margaret of Antioch, the church was built in 1851 to the designs of the architect A B Higham. It cost £2,200 and was consecrated on 31 October 1851 by the Bishop of Ripon, Re. Revd. Charles Longley.

The church replaced the nearby village chapel of ease that was built in 1480. A monument over the north door with a Latin inscription commemorating Reverend Charles Udal, (d. 1782), priest 1750 - 1781 predates the current building. Furniture inside the church is from the 1930s.

Parish status

The church is in a joint parish with
St Oswald's Church, Askrigg
St Mary and St John's Church, Hardraw
St Matthew's Church, Stalling Busk

Organ
A pipe organ was built by T. Hopkins and Son. A specification of the organ can be found on the National Pipe Organ Register.

References

Church of England church buildings in North Yorkshire
Grade II listed churches in North Yorkshire
St Margaret's Church